Richard Cameron Arrington (February 26, 1947 – September 7, 2021) was an American professional football player who was a quarterback for the Philadelphia Eagles of the National Football League (NFL). He played three seasons for the Eagles from 1970–1973. He attended the University of Tulsa and the University of Georgia.

Arrington was born in Charlotte, North Carolina, the son of Hazel (née Cameron; 1925–2013) and Richard Adler Arrington, Jr (1911–1977). Counted amongst the Arrington family's notable ancestors is the gentleman farmer William Farrar.

Arrington was the father of former ESPN college football sideline reporter Jill Arrington and the grandfather of actresses Dakota and Elle Fanning. After 35 years of symptoms, Arrington was diagnosed with Stage IV CTE after he died.

References

1947 births
2021 deaths
American football quarterbacks
Georgia Bulldogs football players
Players of American football from Charlotte, North Carolina
Philadelphia Eagles players
Tulsa Golden Hurricane football players
University of Tulsa alumni